Minor Creek may refer to:

Minor Creek (California)
Minor Creek (Missouri)